Asociația Clubul Sportiv Fotbal Feminin Baia Mare is a Romanian women's football club based in Baia Mare, Maramureș County, Romania. 

The Ladies of the river are currently playing in the Liga I, first tier of the Romanian women's football system, after promoting at the end of the 2017–18 season.

History
Originally founded in 2009 as a female section of Asociația Sportivă Independența Baia Mare, a club founded itself in 2000, it was commonly known as Independența Baia Mare, or simply Independența until 2020. The team first affiliated to Romanian Football Federation only on 8 August 2011, since then playing constantly in the Romanian leagues. At the conclusion of the 2019–20 season which saw the disbandment of fellow Maramureș County club ACS Venus Maramureș, all the women's football actors in the county decided to join forces, and on 15 July 2020 the Independența team was renamed and rebranded to reflect this change. The change was approved in the Romanian Football Federation's Executive Committee of 3 August 2020.

In its history it relegated twice by finishing at the bottom of the top league Superliga after the 2013–14 and 2016–17 seasons, but in both instances it gained the promotion the very next season. Its best result in the top league was 6th place in the 2015–16 Superliga, while in the Romanian Cup, it reached the quarterfinals twice, in 2016–17 and 2018–19.

Chronology of names

Kits and crest 

The team originally used the crest of the club Independența Baia Mare. Between 2009 and 2020 the club colours were green and yellow. 
Since the Fotbal Feminin era, the team colors are burgundy and yellow.

Grounds
Independența Baia Mare played for many years its official matches on Viorel Mateianu Stadium in Baia Mare, with a capacity of 7,000 seats. In 2018 Independența moved  on newly renovated Central Stadium in Recea, with a capacity of only 600 seats.
In 2020 Independența removed its home matches on Viorel Mateianu Stadium in Baia Mare,

Honours

Leagues
Liga II
Winners (1): 2017–18

Season by season

Current squad

Club officials

Board of directors

 Last updated: 18 January 2019
 Source:

Current technical staff

 Last updated: 18 January 2019
 Source:

References

External links
 

Women's football clubs in Romania
Football clubs in Maramureș County
Sport in Baia Mare
Association football clubs established in 2000
2000 establishments in Romania